HMS Beagle was a  10-gun brig-sloop of the Royal Navy, one of more than 100 ships of this class. The vessel, constructed at a cost of £7,803 (roughly equivalent to £ in 2018), was launched on 11 May 1820 from the Woolwich Dockyard on the River Thames. Later reports say the ship took part in celebrations of the coronation of King George IV of the United Kingdom, passing through the old London Bridge, and was the first rigged man-of-war afloat upriver of the bridge. There was no immediate need for Beagle so she "lay in ordinary", moored afloat but without masts or rigging. She was then adapted as a survey barque and took part in three survey expeditions.

The second voyage of HMS Beagle is notable for carrying the recently graduated naturalist Charles Darwin around the world. While the survey work was carried out, Darwin travelled and researched geology, natural history and ethnology onshore. He gained fame by publishing his diary journal, best known as The Voyage of the Beagle, and his findings played a pivotal role in the formation of his scientific theories on evolution and natural selection.

Design and construction
The  of 10-gun brig-sloops was designed by Sir Henry Peake in 1807, and eventually over 100 were constructed. Beagles keel was laid in June 1818, construction cost £7,803, and the ship was launched on 11 May 1820.

The first reported task of the ship was a part in celebrations of the coronation of King George IV of the United Kingdom; in his 1846 Journal, John Lort Stokes said that the ship was taken up the River Thames to salute the coronation, passing through the old London Bridge, and was the first rigged man-of-war afloat upriver of the bridge.

First voyage (1826–1830)
Captain Pringle Stokes was appointed captain of Beagle on 7 September 1825, and the ship was allocated to the surveying section of the Hydrographic Office. On 27 September 1825 The Beagle docked at Woolwich to be repaired and fitted out for her new duties. Her guns were reduced from ten cannon to six and a mizzen mast was added to improve her handling, thereby changing her from a brig to a bark (or barque).

 The Beagle set sail from Plymouth on 22 May 1826 on her first voyage, under the command of Captain Stokes. The mission was to accompany the larger ship HMS Adventure (380 tons) on a hydrographic survey of Patagonia and Tierra del Fuego, under the overall command of the Australian Captain Phillip Parker King, commander and surveyor.

On 3 March 1827 in the Barbara Channel, the Beagle encountered a boat with survivors  of the sealer , which had wrecked in Cockburn Channel on 16 December 1826. Stokes sent two launches to rescue the other survivors who were encamped there.

Faced with the more difficult part of the survey in the desolate waters of Tierra del Fuego, Captain Stokes fell into a deep depression. At Port Famine on the Strait of Magellan he locked himself in his cabin for 14 days, then after getting over-excited and talking of preparing for the next cruise, shot himself on 2 August 1828. Following four days of delirium Stokes recovered slightly, but then his condition deteriorated and he died on 12 August 1828. Captain Parker King then replaced Stokes with the First Lieutenant of Beagle, Lieutenant William George Skyring as commander, and both ships sailed to Montevideo. On 13 October King sailed Adventure to Rio de Janeiro for refitting and provisions. During this work Rear Admiral Sir Robert Otway, commander in chief of the South American station, arrived aboard  and announced his decision that Beagle was also to be brought to Montevideo for repairs, and that he intended to supersede Skyring. When Beagle arrived, Otway put the ship under the command of his aide, Flag Lieutenant Robert FitzRoy.

The 23-year-old aristocrat FitzRoy proved an able commander and meticulous surveyor. In one incident a group of Fuegians stole a ship's boat, and FitzRoy took their families on board as hostages. Eventually he held two men, a girl and a boy, who was given the name of Jemmy Button, and these four native Fuegians were taken back with them when Beagle returned to England on 14 October 1830. During their brief sojourn in England, Boat Memory, the most promising of the four, died of smallpox.

During this survey, the Beagle Channel was identified and named after the ship.

The log book from the first voyage, in Captain FitzRoy's handwriting, was acquired at auction at Sotheby's by the Museo Naval de la Nación (under the administration of the Argentine Navy) located in Tigre, Buenos Aires Province, Argentina, where it is now preserved.

Second voyage (1831–1836)

FitzRoy had been given reason to hope that the South American Survey would be continued under his command, but when the Lords of the Admiralty appeared to abandon the plan, he made alternative arrangements to return the Fuegians. A kind uncle heard of this and contacted the Admiralty. FitzRoy was re-appointed as commander on 27 June 1831 and Beagle was commissioned on 4 July 1831 under his command, with Lieutenants John Clements Wickham and Bartholomew James Sulivan.

Beagle was immediately taken into dock at Devonport for extensive rebuilding and refitting. As she required a new deck, FitzRoy had the upper-deck raised considerably, by  aft and  forward. The Cherokee-class ships had the reputation of being "coffin" brigs, which handled badly and were prone to sinking. Apart from increasing headroom below, the raised deck made Beagle less liable to top-heaviness and possible capsize in heavy weather by reducing the volume of water that could collect on top of the upper deck, trapped aboard by the gunwales. Additional sheathing added to the hull added about seven tons to her burthen and perhaps fifteen to her displacement.

The ship was one of the first to be fitted with the lightning conductor invented by William Snow Harris. FitzRoy spared no expense in her fitting out, which included 22 chronometers, and five examples of the Sympiesometer, a kind of mercury-free barometer patented by Alexander Adie which was favoured by FitzRoy as giving the accurate readings required by the Admiralty. To reduce magnetic interference with the navigational instruments, FitzRoy proposed replacing the iron guns with brass guns, but the Admiralty turned this request down. (When the ship reached Rio de Janeiro in April 1832, he used his own funds for replacements: the ship now had a "six-pound boat-carronade" on a turntable on the forecastle, two brass six-pound guns before the main-mast, and aft of it another four brass guns; two of these were nine-pound, and the other two six-pound.)

FitzRoy had found a need for expert advice on geology during the first voyage, and had resolved that if on a similar expedition, he would "endeavour to carry out a person qualified to examine the land; while the officers, and myself, would attend to hydrography." Command in that era could involve stress and loneliness, as shown by the suicide of Captain Stokes, and FitzRoy's own uncle Viscount Castlereagh had committed suicide under stress of overwork. His attempts to get a friend to accompany him fell through, and he asked his friend and superior Captain Francis Beaufort to seek a gentleman naturalist as a self-financing passenger who would give him company during the voyage. A sequence of inquiries led to Charles Darwin, a young gentleman on his way to becoming a rural clergyman, joining the voyage. FitzRoy was influenced by the physiognomy of Lavater, and Darwin recounted in his autobiography that he was nearly "rejected, on account of the shape of my nose! He was an ardent disciple of Lavater, & was convinced that he could judge a man's character by the outline of his features; & he doubted whether anyone with my nose could possess sufficient energy & determination for the voyage."

Beagle was originally scheduled to leave on 24 October 1831, but because of delays in her preparations the departure was delayed until December. Setting forth on what was to become a ground-breaking scientific expedition, she departed from Devonport on 10 December. Due to bad weather her first stop was just a few miles ahead, at Barn Pool, on the west side of Plymouth Sound. Beagle left anchorage from Barn Pool on 27 December, passing the nearby town of Plymouth. After completing extensive surveys in South America she returned via New Zealand, Sydney, Hobart Town (6 February 1836), to Falmouth, Cornwall, England, on 2 October 1836.

Darwin had kept a diary of his experiences, and combined this with details from his scientific notes as the book titled Journal and Remarks, published in 1839 as the third volume of the official account of the expedition. This travelogue and scientific journal was widely popular, and was reprinted many times with various titles and a revised second edition, becoming known as The Voyage of the Beagle.

Third voyage (1837–1843)

In the six months after returning from the second voyage, some light repairs were made and Beagle was commissioned to survey large parts of the coast of Australia under the command of Commander John Clements Wickham, who had been a lieutenant on the second voyage, with assistant surveyor Lieutenant John Lort Stokes who had been a midshipman on the first voyage of Beagle, then mate and assistant surveyor on the second voyage (no relation to Pringle Stokes). They left Woolwich on 9 June 1837, towed by HM Steamer Boxer, and after reaching Plymouth spent the remainder of the month adjusting their instruments. They set off from Plymouth Sound on the morning of 5 July 1837, and sailed south with stops for observations at Tenerife, Bahia and Cape Town.

They reached the Swan River (modern Perth, Australia) on 15 November 1837. Their survey started with the western coast between there and the Fitzroy River, Western Australia, then surveyed both shores of the Bass Strait at the southeast corner of the continent. To aid Beagle in her surveying operations in Bass Strait, the Colonial cutter Vansittart, of Van Diemen's Land, was most liberally lent by His Excellency Sir John Franklin, and placed under the command of Mr Charles Codrington Forsyth, the senior mate, assisted by Mr Pasco, another of her mates. In May 1839, they sailed north to survey the shores of the Arafura Sea opposite Timor. When Wickham fell ill and resigned, the command was taken over in March 1841 by Lieutenant John Lort Stokes who continued the survey. The third voyage was completed in 1843.

Numerous places around the coast were named by Wickham, and subsequently by Stokes when he became captain, often honouring eminent people or the members of the crew. On 9 October 1839 Wickham named Port Darwin, which was first sighted by Stokes, in honour of their former shipmate Charles Darwin. They were reminded of him (and his "geologising") by the discovery there of a new fine-grained sandstone. A settlement there became the town of Palmerston in 1869, and was renamed Darwin in 1911 (not to be confused with the present day city of Palmerston near Darwin).

During this survey, the Beagle Gulf was named after the ship.

Nicotiana benthamiana, a species of tobacco being used as a platform for the production of recombinant pharmaceutical proteins, was first collected for scientific study on the north coast of Australia by Benjamin Bynoe during this voyage.

Final years
In 1845, Beagle was refitted as a static coastguard watch vessel like many similar watch ships stationed in rivers and harbours throughout the nation. She was transferred to HM Customs and Excise to control smuggling on the Essex coast in the navigable waterways beyond the north bank of the Thames Estuary. She was moored mid-river in the River Roach which forms part of an extensive maze of waterways and marshes known as The River Crouch and River Roach Tidal River System, located around and to the south and west of Burnham-on-Crouch. In 1851, oyster companies and traders who cultivated and harvested the "Walflete" or "Walfleet" oyster Ostrea edulis, petitioned for the Customs and Excise watch vessel WV-7 (ex HMS Beagle) to be removed as she was obstructing the river and its oyster-beds. In the 1851 Navy List dated 25 May, it showed her renamed Southend "W.V. No. 7" at Paglesham. In 1870, she was sold to "Messrs Murray and Trainer" to be broken up.

Possible resting place
Investigations started in 2000 by a team led by Dr Robert Prescott of the University of St Andrews found documents confirming that "W.V. 7" was Beagle, and noted a vessel matching her size shown midstream on the River Roach (in Paglesham Reach) on the 1847 hydrographic survey chart. A later chart showed a nearby indentation to the north bank of Paglesham Reach near the Eastend Wharf and near Waterside Farm. This could have been a dock for W.V. 7 – Beagle. This discovery matched the chart position and many fragments of pottery of the correct period were found in the same area. 

Surveys in November 2003 showed that there are the remains of substantial material within the dock that could be parts of the ship itself. An old anchor of 1841 pattern was excavated. It was also found that the 1871 census recorded a new farmhouse in the name of William Murray and Thomas Rainer, leading to speculation that the merchant's name was a misprint for T. Rainer. The farmhouse was demolished in the 1940s, but a nearby boathouse incorporated timbers matching knee timbers used in Beagle. Two more large anchors similar to the one excavated from the ship's present location are known to have been found in neighbouring villages. It is believed that there were four anchors in the ship.

Their investigations featured in a BBC television programme which showed how each watch ship would have accommodated seven coastguard officers, drawn from other areas to minimise collusion with the locals. Each officer had about three rooms to house his family, forming a small community. They would use small boats to intercept smugglers, and the investigators found a causeway giving access at low tide across the soft mud of the river bank. Apparently the next coastguard station along was Kangaroo, a sister ship of Beagle.

See also

 Museo Nao Victoria § HMS Beagle, a full-scale replica of the vessel completed in 2016
 Beagle 2 – Mars space probe, lost on 25 December 2003, named after HMS Beagle
 Ship's chronometer from HMS Beagle
 The Voyage of the Space Beagle, a science fiction adventure by A. E. van Vogt loosely inspired by Darwin's voyage aboard HMS Beagle
 European and American voyages of scientific exploration

Notes

Sources and references

 
. Abridged version of Darwin's Journal and Remarks.
 
 
 
 
 
 Marquardt, Karl, HMS Beagle: Survey Ship Extraordinary Conway Maritime Press, 2010.  
 , Volume 1, Volume 2

External links

 Darwin Online – bibliography: Proceedings of the first and second expeditions, and Darwin's Journal (The Voyage of the Beagle).
  list includes The Voyage of the Beagle
 John Lort Stokes, Discoveries in Australia, Volume 1, Volume 2.
 Digitised copies of the original logs of HMS Beagle, British Atmospheric Data Centre/The National Archives as part of the CORRAL project
 Robert FitzRoy, 1836, Sketch of the Surveying Voyages of his Majesty's Ships Adventure and Beagle, 1825–1836. Commanded by Captains P. P. King, P. Stokes, and R. Fitz-Roy, Royal Navy. Journal of the Geological Society of London 6: 311–343
 Visit and Testimony of Captain Fitz-Roy
 HMS Beagle – Port Cities
 The sympiesometer of Alexander Adie
 The Journal of Syms Covington – Chapter 1.
 The replica HMS Beagle project
 BBC News – Darwin's Beagle ship 'found'
 The Observer – Evolution of radar points to HMS Beagle′s resting place.
 BBC News – Plans to build HMS Beagle replica for 2009 Darwin bicentenary.
 Former official blog of the building process for the full size HMS Beagle replica.

 
Charles Darwin
Cherokee-class brig-sloops
Exploration of Western Australia
Exploration ships of the United Kingdom
Individual sailing vessels
Brig-sloops of the Royal Navy
Ships built in Woolwich
1820 ships
Maritime exploration of Australia